In enzymology, a tRNA sulfurtransferase is an enzyme that catalyzes the chemical reaction

L-cysteine + 'activated' tRNA  L-serine + tRNA containing a thionucleotide

Thus, the two substrates of this enzyme are L-cysteine and 'activated' tRNA, whereas its two products are L-serine and tRNA containing a thionucleotide.

This enzyme belongs to the family of transferases, specifically the sulfurtransferases, which transfer sulfur-containing groups.  The systematic name of this enzyme class is L-cysteine:tRNA sulfurtransferase. Other names in common use include transfer ribonucleate sulfurtransferase, RNA sulfurtransferase, ribonucleate sulfurtransferase, transfer RNA sulfurtransferase, and transfer RNA thiolase.

References

 
 
 
 

EC 2.8.1
Enzymes of unknown structure